Taklamakan is a short story by American writer Bruce Sterling. It was first published in the 1998 Oct/Nov volume of Asimov's Science Fiction.

Plot 
The story follows a government contracted spy and his coworker as they enter the Taklamakan Desert to explore and substantiate rumors about a group of Chinese habitats that simulate generation ships in a cave under the Taklamakan Desert.

Reception 
It won the 1999 Hugo Award for Best Novelette as well as the 1999 Foreign Short Story Hayakawa Award.

References

1998 short stories
Science fiction short stories
Short stories by Bruce Sterling